The 2001 African U-17 Championship qualification was a men's under-17 football competition which decided the participating teams of the 2001 African U-17 Championship.

Qualification

Preliminary round
The first leg matches were played on either the 14th or 16 April 2000. The second leg matches were played on either the 28th or 30 April 2000. The winners advanced to the First Round.

|}

First round
The first leg matches were played on either 23 or 25 June 2000. The second leg matches were played on either 7 or 9 July 2000. The winners advanced to the second round.
 

|}

Second round
The first leg matches were played on either 11 or 12 November 2000. The second leg matches were played on either 24, 25 or 26 November. The winners advanced to the finals.

|}

Qualified teams

 

 (host nation)

Notes and references

External links
 African U-17 Championship 2001 - rsssf.org

Under-17 Championship Qualification, 2001
2001